Xiwai International School is an international school in Shanghai, China.

References

 Xiwai International School Roots and Shoots Program- 
 Xiwai International School selected and preferred by parents in NEWSWEEK- http://www.smh.com.au/world/china-boasts-the-worlds-top-students-but-are-they-equipped-to-cope-beyond-the-classroom-20140524-38vvu.html
 Xiwai International School mentioned in New York Times- China - Education - Schools - Re-education - Ann Hulbert …

External links

2005 establishments in China
Educational institutions established in 2005
International schools in China
Schools in Shanghai